Steal My Heart may refer to:

 Steal My Heart (film), a South Korean film
 Steal My Heart (Barbara Freethy novel), a novel by Barbara Freethy
 "Steal My Heart" (Badfinger song), a song by Badfinger
 "Steal My Heart" (Marit Larsen song), a song by Marit Larsen